The , also known as the Black Society trilogy, is a series of films directed by Japanese filmmaker Takashi Miike involving Chinese triads and Japanese yakuza.

The series includes three separate films without storyline crossovers, and were each released two years apart between 1995–1999. Tomorowo Taguchi plays a prominent role in all three of the films, albeit as a different character in each.

The term kuro-shakai is a Japanese word literally meaning "black society" or underworld.

Films

Features of the trilogy 
Similar to Dead or Alive, this is also an anomalous trilogy, as the three films are connected to each other only by the presence of actor Tomorowo Taguchi, while the stories are dissimilar to each other and tell of men and women uprooted from their homeland, China or Japan, employed by the Chinese Triad or the Yakuza.

Shinjuku Triad Society 
The first film of the trilogy is set in Shinjuku Ward and tells of a corrupt policeman of Chinese origin who, investigating the murders commissioned by a Taiwanese boss, discovers that his brother lawyer is involved in an organ trafficking run which starts a war between police and criminals.

Rainy Dog 
The second film in the trilogy is set in Taipei and is about an exiled Japanese yakuza forced to work as a hitman for the local Triad. A woman entrusts him with a dumb child, claiming that he is her son. The boy starts following the man, who meets a Chinese prostitute and thus creates a kind of family.

The cop-brother-criminal triangle from the previous film is translated here into these three characters, while the incessant rain recalls the decadent atmosphere of the Shinjuku neighborhood.

Ley Lines 
With the third film of the trilogy, Takashi Miike said he wanted to bring his characters back to Shinjuku ward, retracing their past. In fact, the film tells of three boys of Chinese origins who dream of leaving Japan for Brazil. To illegally enter the South American country, the three are forced to work for the underworld and meet a prostitute who joins them.

Reception
Grady Hendrix of The New York Sun, commented on the Trilogy, noting that "the three movies that make up his loosely related Black Society Trilogy are the work of a socially committed, ferociously intelligent director - albeit one who still takes time out from raging against the machine for raunchy sex jokes and blunt-force trauma."

Jasper Sharp of the British Film Institute commented on the series, stating that among Miike's gangster films, the trilogy was "widely seen as among his best" with "Miike’s fast-paced cutting, acutely-developed and innovative mise-en-scène and hyperbolic approach to onscreen violence spring to the fore, although there is plenty more going on beneath the bombastic onscreen onslaught."

References

External links
 
 
 

Japanese film series
Trilogies
Film series introduced in 1995